Karl Friedrich Neumann (28 December 1793 – 17 March 1870) was a German orientalist.

Life

Neumann was born, under the name of Bamberger, at Reichsmannsdorf, near Bamberg. He studied philosophy and philology at Heidelberg, Munich and Göttingen, became a convert to Protestantism and took the name of Neumann. From 1821 to 1825 he was a teacher in Würzburg and Speyer; then he learned Armenian in Venice at the San Lazzaro degli Armeni and visited Paris and London.

In 1829 he went to China, where he studied the language and amassed a large library of valuable books and manuscripts. These, about 12,000 in number, he presented to the royal library at Munich. Returning to Germany in 1833, Neumann was made professor of Armenian and Chinese in the university of Munich. He held this position until 1852, when, owing to his pronounced revolutionary opinions, he was removed from his chair. Ten years later he settled in Berlin, where he remained until his death in 1870.

Neumann's leisure time after his enforced retirement was occupied in historical studies, and besides his "Geschichte des englischen Reichs in Asien" (Leipzig, 1857, 2 volumes), he wrote a history of the United States of America, Geschichte der Vereinigten Staaten von Amerika (Berlin, 1863-1866, 3 volumes).

His other works include:
Versuch einer Geschichte der armenischen Literatur (Leipzig, 1836)
Die Völker des südlichen Russland (1846, and again 1855)
Geschichte des englisch-chinesischen Kriegs (1846, and again 1855)
He also issued some translations from Chinese and Armenian:
The Catechism of the shamans, or, The laws and regulations of the priesthood of Buddha in China (1831).
Vahram's Chronicle of the Armenian Kingdom in Cilicia, during the time of the Crusades (1831); translation of Vahram of Edessa (fl. c. 1303-1330).
History of the pirates who infested the China Sea from 1807-1810 (1831).
The journal of the Royal Asiatic Society (London, 1871) contains a full list of his works.

References 
 

1793 births
1870 deaths
19th-century German historians
19th-century German translators
German orientalists
German sinologists
Armenian studies scholars
Academic staff of the Ludwig Maximilian University of Munich
Heidelberg University alumni
Ludwig Maximilian University of Munich alumni
German people of Jewish descent
Burials at the Alter Südfriedhof
San Lazzaro degli Armeni alumni
19th-century German male writers
19th-century German writers
German male non-fiction writers